The 2014 NHL Stadium Series (branded the 2014 Coors Light NHL Stadium Series) was a series of four outdoor regular season National Hockey League (NHL) games played during the 2013–14 season. This series is distinct from the NHL Winter Classic and NHL Heritage Classic outdoor games. The Stadium Series games consisted of: the Los Angeles Kings against the Anaheim Ducks at Dodger Stadium in Los Angeles on January 25, 2014; the New Jersey Devils against the New York Rangers at Yankee Stadium in the Bronx of New York City on January 26; the New York Islanders against the Rangers at Yankee Stadium on January 29; and the Pittsburgh Penguins against the Chicago Blackhawks at Soldier Field in Chicago on March 1, 2014.

The Stadium Series was staged in between the season's two other outdoor games: the Detroit Red Wings hosting the Toronto Maple Leafs in the 2014 NHL Winter Classic at Michigan Stadium in Ann Arbor, Michigan, on January 1, 2014; and the Vancouver Canucks hosting the Ottawa Senators in the 2014 Heritage Classic at BC Place in Vancouver on March 2. After the conclusion of their two Stadium Series games, the Rangers had played four outdoor games, the most of any NHL team, having previously participated in the 2012 NHL Winter Classic and the 1991 exhibition game in Las Vegas.

Dodger Stadium (January 25)

The first game of the series at Dodger Stadium featured performances by Kiss and Five for Fighting before the game and between the periods, and the opening ceremonies included Vin Scully and Wayne Gretzky.

The Anaheim Ducks shut-out the Los Angeles Kings in the inaugural Stadium Series game, 3–0, with Jonas Hiller making 36 saves.

Number in parentheses represents the player's total in goals or assists to that point of the season

Team rosters

 Frederik Andersen and Martin Jones dressed as the back-up goaltenders. Neither entered the game.

Yankee Stadium games
The second and third Stadium Series games were played at Yankee Stadium, when the Rangers played the Devils and the Islanders on January 26 and 29, 2014, respectively. The Rangers were considered the away team for both games; their home arena, Madison Square Garden, receives tax-exempt status, but only if the Rangers do not "cease playing" home games at MSG,  generally interpreted as playing any "home" game outside of MSG.

January 26
The second game of the 2014 NHL Stadium Series took place on January 26, 2014, and was part one of a doubleheader at Yankee Stadium in New York City, featuring the New Jersey Devils and the New York Rangers. This was the NHL's first outdoor game in New York City. The Devils were the designated home team for this game.

The game was originally supposed to start at 12:30 PM, but it was delayed for over an hour due to sun glare and it started at 1:38 PM.  

The New York Rangers won 7–3 behind Henrik Lundqvist's 19 saves. After being down 3–2 in the first period, the Rangers stormed back and romped over the Devils by scoring four unanswered goals in the second period and adding another goal by Derek Stepan on a penalty shot in the third period. Mats Zuccarello netted two goals for the Rangers. Also scoring for the Rangers included Rick Nash, Marc Staal and Carl Hagelin. Patrik Elias scored two goals for the Devils and Travis Zajac scored one goal. 

Number in parenthesis represents the player's total in goals or assists to that point of the season

Team rosters

January 29

The third game of the 2014 NHL Stadium Series took place on January 29, 2014, and was the second part of a doubleheader at Yankee Stadium in New York City, featuring the New York Islanders and the New York Rangers, who played their second straight game outdoors. The Islanders were the designated home team for this game.

The Rangers won the game 2–1 after overcoming a 1–0 deficit in the second period. Henrik Lundqvist made 30 saves in the game, earning the victory for the Rangers. Benoit Pouliot and Daniel Carcillo scored for the Rangers, while Brock Nelson scored the Islanders' lone goal. 

Number in parenthesis represents the player's total in goals or assists to that point of the season

Team rosters

Soldier Field (March 1)

The fourth and final game of the 2014 NHL Stadium Series took place on March 1, 2014, at Soldier Field in Chicago, featuring the Pittsburgh Penguins and the Chicago Blackhawks. The game concluded Hockey Weekend Across America.

Chicago defeated Pittsburgh 5–1, with Corey Crawford making 31 saves. Jonathan Toews scored two goals for Chicago. Chicago's other three goals were scored by Patrick Sharp, Kris Versteeg and Bryan Bickell. James Neal scored Pittsburgh's lone goal. 

Number in parenthesis represents the player's total in goals or assists to that point of the season

Team rosters

Uniforms
Each team wore specially-designed uniforms for the event, except for the Devils, who wore throwback uniforms in the team's original red and green color scheme. The Islanders unveiled their Stadium Series jersey on November 27, 2013. The Ducks and Kings jointly unveiled their Stadium Series jerseys on December 3. The Penguins unveiled their Stadium Series jersey on December 13. The Blackhawks and Rangers unveiled their Stadium Series jerseys on December 20. Penguins goalie Marc-André Fleury wore a Pittsburgh Steelers inspired goalie mask for the Penguins-Blackhawks game.

Reality television series
The inaugural Stadium Series was the basis for a seven-part documentary called NHL Revealed: A Season Like No Other, premiering January 22, 2014, on the NBC Sports Network, and debuting in Canada the next day on CBC. The series was meant to differ from the pre-existing HBO 24/7: Road to the NHL Winter Classic with an added focus on star players' preparations for the 2014 Olympic Tournament in Sochi, Russia, of which NBCSN and CBC were major broadcasters.

Television ratings

Game 1 produced a 0.35 national rating and 622,000 viewers on the NBC Sports Network. While unimpressive, the numbers were considerably higher than average for NBCSN's ratings-challenged West Coast games. In Los Angeles, the game drew a 2.38 local rating, making NBCSN the highest rated cable channel (and second-highest rated overall) in the area during the broadcast. It was the network's best performance for an NHL regular season game in the market.
Game 2 produced a 1.3 national rating and 2.091 million viewers for NBC, good enough to beat all non-regionalized indoor regular season broadcasts since the NHL's return to NBC in 2005, but not quite coming close to the viewership attracted by Winter Classic-branded outdoor games. The game drew a 5.1 local rating in New York, tying Game 1 of the 2012 Stanley Cup Final as the best performance in the market for the current incarnation of the NHL on NBC. The mark stood until the Rangers' strong Stanley Cup playoff run a few months later.
Game 3 produced a 0.41 national rating and 682,000 viewers on NBCSN, rather ordinary numbers for the Wednesday Night Rivalry franchise. In New York, it drew a 3.58 local rating, the best performance in the market for an NHL regular season game on NBCSN.
Game 4, played in prime time on NBC, produced a 2.1 national rating, the highest rating for a regular season game outside the Winter Classic since NBC took over the broadcast contract.

See also

 NHL Winter Classic
 NHL Heritage Classic
 List of outdoor ice hockey games

References

2014 Stadium Series
NHL Stadium Series
NHL Stadium Series
NHL Stadium Series
NHL Stadium Series
2010s in Chicago
2014 in Illinois
NHL Stadium Series
Anaheim Ducks games
Los Angeles Kings games
New York Rangers games
New Jersey Devils games
New York Islanders games
Pittsburgh Penguins games
Chicago Blackhawks games
Ice hockey competitions in New York City
Sports in the Bronx
Ice hockey competitions in Los Angeles
NHL Stadium Series
NHL Stadium Series
2010s in Manhattan
Ice hockey competitions in Chicago